was a Heian period Japanese government official, calligrapher, and member of the Tachibana family. He travelled to China in 804, returning in 806. He died while traveling to exile in Izu Province for supposed participation in an imperial succession controversy. His most famous remaining calligraphic work is the Ito Naishin'no Ganmon (伊都内親王願文), now in the Imperial Household collection. He is honored as one of the group of three outstanding calligraphers called Sanpitsu (Three Brushes).

He is honored posthumously as a kami at Kami Goryo Shrine Kyoto.

References
Hermann Bohner, 'Tachibana-no-Hayanari-den' from Monumenta Nipponica, Vol. 5, No. 1 (Jan., 1942), pp. 188–202.

9th-century Japanese calligraphers
People of Heian-period Japan
782 births
844 deaths
Japanese ambassadors to the Tang dynasty
Deified Japanese people